FSN analysis is an inventory management technique. It is an important aspect in logistics. The items are classified according to their rate of consumption. The items are classified broadly into three groups: F – means Fast moving, S – means Slow moving, N – means Non-moving. The FSN analysis is conducted generally on the following basis:
The last date of receipt of the items or the last date of the issue of items, whichever is later, is taken into account.
The time period is usually calculated in terms of months or number of days and it pertains to the time elapsed since the last movement was recorded.
 
FSN analysis helps a company in identification of the following
The items considered to be “active” may be reviewed regularly on more frequent basis.
Items whose stocks at hand are higher as compared to their rates of consumption.
Non-moving item have zero consumption are generally absolutely.

Goods (economics)